Venkatesh Atmaram Desai (born 5 July 1948/49) is an Indian politician and businessperson from Goa. He is a former member of the Goa Legislative Assembly, representing the Valpoi Assembly constituency from 1999 to 2002. He also served as a council minister in the Sardinha ministry.

Early and personal life
Venkatesh Atmaram Desai was born in Advoi-Sattari, Goa. He is married to Suvarna Desai. He completed his 7th grade from Marathi Mulanchi Shala, Khanapur in 1960. Desai later completed his diploma in mechanical engineering. He is also a businessperson and farmer by profession. He currently resides at Sattari, Goa.

Political career
Prior contesting the Goa Legislative elections in 1999, Desai served as a sarpanch of the Pissurlem panchayat from 1981 to 1986. He was also the sarpanch of Bhironda panchayat in 1987 and later elected as a deputy sarpanch from the same panchayat.

Controversy
On 11 January 2011, prior to the 2012 Goa Legislative Assembly election, fellow MLA, Vishwajit Rane of Valpoi Assembly constituency lodged a complaint against Desai, for distribution of fake job letters amongst the youth in the constituency. However Desai denied any involvement of the same when contacted by the Election Commission of India.

Positions held
Councillor of Valpoi Municipal Council
Treasurer of Mahadei Bachao Andolan
Chairman of Kadamba Transport Corporation Ltd.

References

Living people
1940s births
People from North Goa district
Members of the Goa Legislative Assembly
Goa MLAs 1999–2002